Nils Fredrik Rinman (28 November 1880 – 19 October 1939) was a sailor from Sweden, who represented his country at the 1924 Summer Olympics in Le Havre, France.

References

Sources
 
 

Swedish male sailors (sport)
Sailors at the 1924 Summer Olympics – 6 Metre
Olympic sailors of Sweden
1880 births
1939 deaths
Royal Swedish Yacht Club sailors
Sportspeople from Stockholm